The Coastal Carolina Chanticleers women's basketball team is the women's basketball team that represents Coastal Carolina University in Conway, South Carolina, United States. The school's team currently competes in the Sun Belt Conference.

History
As of the end of the 2015–16 season, the Chanticleers have an all-time record of 482–656. Coastal Carolina joined the Big South Conference in 1986, playing for 30 years before leaving for the Sun Belt Conference beginning with the 2016-17 season. In the 30 years they played in the Big South, they went 181–259. They have never qualified for the NCAA Tournament. They lost in the tournament championship in 1999, 2000, and 2002, with the winner being Liberty each time.

References

External links